Milan Lasica (3 February 1940 – 18 July 2021) was a popular Slovak comedian, actor, singer, writer, lyricist and satirist. Active from 1961 up to his death, he was known mainly from his double act with Július Satinský and their collaboration with musician Jaroslav Filip.

Lasica was born in Zvolen, Slovakia. He died aged 81 from heart failure, right during his performance in Bratislava, just after he had given a bow after a song from his show called "I am an Optimist".

Family
Zora Kolínska – first wife (1962–1970)
Magdaléna Vášáryová – second wife (from 1980 to his death)

References

1940 births
2021 deaths
Slovak Lutherans
Slovak comedians
Slovak male film actors
20th-century Slovak male singers
Slovak writers
Slovak lyricists
Slovak satirists
Academy of Performing Arts in Bratislava alumni
People from Zvolen
Deaths onstage
Recipients of Medal of Merit (Czech Republic)
Slovak male stage actors
Slovak male television actors
Czechoslovak male singers